Iris scissors are a type of scissors with short blades that was originally developed for ophthalmic surgery. They are alternatively referred to as Iris forceps in the United Kingdom and Asia. Iris scissors are also available in the crafting market and are sometimes used for the production of fabric-related goods. Both closed and open shank versions are available.

Description
Iris scissors are very small, with an extremely sharp and fine tip. Some iris scissors have curved blades for certain types of precision tasks, while others may have straight blades.

See also
Surgical scissors
Instruments used in general surgery
Iris Scissors

References

Surgical scissors